Nazim Aliyev (born 5 April 1963) is Azerbaijani former professional footballer who played as a forward. He is the all time topscorer of the Azerbaijan Premier League. He obtained one cap for the national team in 1993.

Aliyev began playing football for Neftchi Baku PFC's reserve side. He joined Soviet Second League side Khazar Sumgayit in 1988 and would play for the club until 1994.

Honours

Individual
Azerbaijan Premier League Top Scorer (3): 1992, 1994–95, 1997–98

External links
 
 Profile at KLISF

Living people
1963 births
Footballers from Baku
Soviet footballers
Azerbaijani footballers
Azerbaijan international footballers
Association football forwards
Qarabağ FK players
Neftçi PFK players